Modulo-N code is a lossy compression algorithm used to compress correlated data sources using modular arithmetic.

Compression
Hence the name modulo-N code.

Since at least  bits are required to represent a number K in binary, the modulo coded data of the two nodes requires  bits. As we can generally expect  always, because . This is the how compression is achieved.

A compression ratio achieved is

Decompression
At the receiver by joint decoding we may complete the process of extracting the data and rebuilding the original values. The code from the even node is reconstructed by the assumption that it must be  close to the data from the odd node. Hence the decoding algorithm retrieves even node data as

 

Example
For a mod-8 code, we have 
Encoder
 D_o=43,D_e=47
 M_o=43,M_e=47 mod(8) = 7,
 
Decoder
  M_o=43,M_e=47 mod(8) = 7,
  D_o=43,D_e=CLOSEST(43,8⋅k + 7)
  
  D_o=43,D_e=47

Modulo-N decoding is similar to phase unwrapping and has the same limitation: If the difference from one node to the next is more than N/2 (if the phase changes from one sample to the next more than ), then decoding leads to an incorrect value.

See also
 DISCUS is a more sophisticated technique for compressing correlated data sources.
 Delta encoding is a related algorithm used in lossless compression algorithms designed for correlated data sources.

Information theory
Data compression
Wireless sensor network